Peel or Peeling may refer to:

Places

Australia 
 Peel (Western Australia)
 Peel Island, Queensland
Peel, New South Wales
 Peel River (New South Wales)

Canada 
 Peel Parish, New Brunswick
 Peel, New Brunswick, an unincorporated community in Peel Parish
 Peel River (Canada), tributary of the Mackenzie River
 Peel Sound, Nunavut
 Regional Municipality of Peel, Ontario (Peel County until 1973)
Peel (federal electoral district)
Peel (provincial electoral district)

United Kingdom 
 Peel Fell, a hill in Kielder Forest
 Peel Island, Cumbria
 Peels, Northumberland, in Harbottle

United States 
 Peel, Arkansas
 Peel, Oregon

Elsewhere
 Peel, Isle of Man
 Peel, Netherlands

People

Surname 
 Andrée Peel (1905–2010), member of the French Resistance during the Second World War
 Ann Peel (born 1961), Canadian race walker
 Arthur Peel (disambiguation)
 Clifford Peel (1894–1918), Australian World War I pilot

 Dwayne Peel (born 1981), Welsh rugby union player
 Edward Peel (big-game fisherman) (1884–1961), British army officer, businessman and amateur sportsman
 Edward Peel (born 1943), British actor
 Frederick Peel (1823–1906), British politician and railway commissioner
 Harry Peel (disambiguation)
 Homer Peel (1902–1997), American Major League Baseball player
 Jennie Hallam-Peel, British debutante and chairwoman of the Queen Charlotte's Ball
 John Peel (disambiguation)
 Jonathan Peel (1799–1879), British soldier and politician
 Lawrence Peel (1799–1884), British judge in India
 Mark Peel (historian) (born 1959), Australian historian and academic
 Paul Peel (1860–1892), Canadian painter
 Peter Peel (1866–1960), United States soccer administrator
 Robert Peel (1788–1850), British founder of the (London) Metropolitan Police, later Prime Minister
 Robert Peel (disambiguation)
 Samuel W. Peel (1831–1924), U.S. Representative from Arkansas
 Sir Sidney Peel, 1st Baronet (1870–1938), British soldier, financier and politician
 Thomas Peel (1793–1865), early settler of Western Australia
 William Peel (disambiguation)

Titles 
 Earl Peel, title in the British peerage
 Peel baronets, three separate British baronetcies

Arts, entertainment, and media

Music
 Peel (band), indie rock band from Austin, Texas
 Peel (US band), a US band active from 1999–2001 formed by Kevin Ridel from Los Angeles, California

Other arts, entertainment, and media
 Peel (1982 film), an Australian short film directed by Jane Campion
 Peel (2019 film), a British comedy-drama starring Emile Hirsch
 Emma Peel, a fictional character in the television series The Avengers

Brands and enterprises
 Peel Hotels, UK hotel company
 Peel Engineering Company, Manx boat and car manufacturer
 Peel Technologies, makers of the Peel Smart Remote, an Android and iOS app to control TV and other home devices
 The Peel Group or Peel Holdings, UK property company, owner of several "Peel Centres"

Technology
 Peel (software), Mac application for listening to songs from MP3 blogs
 Peel (tool), long handled tool used in baking
 PEEL, programmable electrically erasable logic, variant of the GAL (generic array logic)
 Bitrate peeling, Ogg Vorbis technique for changing the bitrate of an audio stream

Transit
 Peel Hall tram stop, in Manchester, England
 Peel railway station (Isle of Man), in Peel, Isle of Man
 Peel Road railway station, in Peel, Isle of Man
 Peel station (Montreal Metro), in Montreal, Quebec, Canada

Skin or rind
 Peel (fruit), skin of fruit
 Peeling of animal skin, also called moulting
 Peeling of human skin, also called desquamation, such as from a sunburn
 Chemical peel, a treatment that uses a chemical solution to remove the outer layer of dead skin

Sports
 Peel A.F.C., an association football club from Peel, Isle of Man
 Peel Thunder Football Club, an Australian rules football club
 Peel, a croquet term

Other uses
 Center peel, or "Peel", infantry retreat technique
 Peel Commission, Royal Commission of Inquiry into Palestine, 1936–1937
 Peel tower, a fortified keep or watchtower

See also
 Orange Peel (disambiguation)
 Peal (disambiguation)
 Peale (disambiguation)
 Peel Park (disambiguation)
 Peel Street (disambiguation)
 Peele (disambiguation)
 Peeler (disambiguation)
Surnames of English origin